Nigeria competed at the 2022 Commonwealth Games held in Birmingham, England from 28 July to 8 August 2022. It was Nigeria's 15th appearance at the Commonwealth Games.

Nnamdi Chinecherem and Folashade Oluwafemiayo were the country's flagbearers during the opening ceremony.

Medalists

Competitors
The following is the list of number of competitors participating at the Games per sport/discipline.

Athletics

Men
Track and road events

Field events

Women
Track and road events

Field events

Boxing

Men

Women

Judo

A squad of two judoka was entered as of 8 July 2022.

Para powerlifting

Table tennis

Nigeria qualified for both team events via the ITTF World Team Rankings (as of 2 January 2020). Eight players were selected on 8 July 2022.

Singles

Doubles

Team

Weightlifting

As of 16 March 2022, nine weightlifters (two men, seven women) qualified for the competition.

Stella Kingsley, Adijat Olarinoye, Rafiatu Folashade Lawal and Joy Ogbonne Eze qualified by winning gold at the 2021 Commonwealth Weightlifting Championships in Tashkent, Uzbekistan. The other five qualified via the IWF Commonwealth Ranking List, which was finalised on 9 March 2022.

Men

Women

Wrestling

Repechage Format

Group Stage Format

Nordic Format

Notes

See also
Nigeria at the 2022 Winter Olympics

References

External links
Nigeria Olympic Committee Official site
Birmingham 2022 Commonwealth Games Official site

2022
Nations at the 2022 Commonwealth Games
Commonwealth Games